Maximiliano Nicolás Velázquez (born 12 September 1980 in Concepción del Uruguay, Entre Ríos) is an Argentine football left back. He currently plays for Aldosivi in the Primera B Nacional.

Career

Velázquez started his professional career in 1998 with Ferro Carril Oeste in the Argentine Primera División. Although the club were relegated at the end of the 1999-2000 season, Velázquez opted to stay with them. In 2002 the club suffered a further relegation into the Regionalised 3rd division. Velázquez again opted to stay with the club and helped them to secure promotion back to the 2nd level by winning the 2002-03 Primera B Metropolitana championship.

In 2003 Velázquez returned to the Argentine primera after his transfer to Talleres de Córdoba, but despite finishing 3rd in the Clausura 2004 the club were relegated due to their poor points average and a playoff defeat to Argentinos Juniors.

Velázquez then joined Lanús, where he has established himself as an important member of the first team squad. In 2007, he was part of the squad that won the Apertura 2007 tournament, Lanús' first ever top flight league title.

In 2010, Velázquez joined Independiente.

In February 2012, Velázquez cancelled his contract on Independiente and rejoined Lanús.

Honours
Ferro Carril Oeste
Primera B Metropolitana (1): 2002–03

Lanús
Argentine Primera División (1): 2007 Apertura
Copa Sudamericana (1): 2013

Independiente
Copa Sudamericana (1): 2010

References

External links
  
 

1980 births
Living people
Sportspeople from Entre Ríos Province
Argentine footballers
Association football defenders
Argentine Primera División players
Primera B Metropolitana players
Ferro Carril Oeste footballers
Talleres de Córdoba footballers
Club Atlético Lanús footballers
Club Atlético Independiente footballers